Camp Grove is an unincorporated community in Marshall County, Illinois, United States, located  east-northeast of Wyoming and 27.6 miles (44.4 km) north of Peoria. Camp Grove has a post office with ZIP code 61424.

The Camp Grove Wind Farm is located adjacent to the community.

History
Camp Grove was platted in 1901. It was named from a camp in a grove near the town site.

References

Unincorporated communities in Marshall County, Illinois
Unincorporated communities in Illinois
Peoria metropolitan area, Illinois
1901 establishments in Illinois